Andrea Salvatore di Antonio Aglio, sometimes spelled Allio (1736-1786), was an Italian painter sculptor, born in Arzo, who specialized in painting on marble.

Aglio was born in Arzo.  Notes about his life are provided by the Historical Dictionary of illustrious men of the Canton Ticino, published in 1807 by Gian Alfonso Oldelli, from Meride (who personally knew the artist). Very young, in 1736, he went to Dresden where we stayed for 22 years, working as lapidary (the marble altar (1756) of the church of Borna is his work). He also dedicated to experiment marble coloration techniques, working with acids that finally resulted in his death.

References 

1736 births
1786 deaths
18th-century Italian painters
Italian male painters
Painters from Milan
18th-century Italian male artists